Ben Hackworth (born 12 July 1977) is an Australian writer and film director. He is best known for his work on the films Martin Four, Corroboree and Celeste.

Biography
Ben was born in Brisbane, Queensland. His father is retired Colonel David Hackworth. He studied at Amherst College in the United States, before returning to Australian to complete a Masters of Film at Victorian College of the Arts. In 2005, he completed a Masters of Film with his script for a feature film called The Serpent. In 2006, he was accepted into the prestigious Cannes Film Festival residence to develop this project in Paris.

He has created several award-winning short films, including:
 Martin Four (2001); official selection Cannes Film Festival, 2001
 Violet Lives Upstairs (2003); winner of Film Critics Circle of Australia, 2003, award for Best Short Film

In 2007, he released his debut feature-length film, Corroboree, which has been selected at Berlin, Toronto, Sydney, Melbourne, Brisbane and Perth International Film Festivals.

His latest film Celeste, starring Radha Mitchell, Thomas Cocquerel, Nadine Garner and Odessa Young which had its world premiere at Melbourne International Film Festival, international premiere at BFI London Film Festival and was selected for competition at Santa Barbara International Film Festival.

Filmography

References

External links
 
Notes on the Death of Beauty, Art and Talent: A Correspondence with Ben Hackworth

1977 births
Living people
Australian film directors